Charmed was a Norwegian girl band.

Overview
The group Charmed made their debut in the Norwegian national final of the Eurovision Song Contest with the song "My Heart Goes Boom". 

Charmed were three girls in their mid-twenties:Oddrun Valestrand, Lise Monica Nygård, and Hanne Kristine Haugsand.  Valestrand is a dancer and an all-round performer. Nygård writes her own lyrics. Haugsand is a dancer and a singer.

After winning the Melodi Grand Prix they represented Norway in the Eurovision Song Contest 2000 and finished in 11th position.

Hanne participated in 2006 as a solo act in the Melodi Grand Prix with "Heaven's In Your Eyes". She didn't proceed to the final. She also participated in 2010, again without getting to the final.

Lise Monica featured in a duet as a guest vocalist on the drum and bass ballad "Without U" featured on the album Poquito Loco by Costa.

References

Eurovision Song Contest entrants for Norway
Eurovision Song Contest entrants of 2000
Melodi Grand Prix contestants
Melodi Grand Prix winners
English-language singers from Norway